Evgeni Gordiets (born 1 April 1952) is a Soviet surrealist painter. Honored Artist of Ukraine (1986). He is a member of the National Union of Artists of Ukraine (1979).

Biography 
Evgeni Gordiets was born on April 1, 1952, in the city of Makeyevka, Donetsk Oblast.

In 1967, he entered the Shevchenko Art School in Kiev.

From 1971 to 1977, he studied at and graduated from the Kiev State Art Institute, where his teacher was Alexander Mikhailovich Lopukhov. Then, from 1978 to 1982, Gordiets studied at and graduated from the fellowship in Creative Workshop of the USSR Academy of Arts in Kiev (1978-1982), where his professor was Sergey Alekseevich Grigoryev.

From 1977 to 1991 he worked in the professional Art Association “Artist".

From 1977 to 1978 he was a professor at the Kiev State Art Institute.

Since 1979 he has been a member of the National Union of Artists of Ukraine.

From 1978 to 1982 he had a fellowship at the Creative Workshops of the USSR Academy of Arts in Kiev.

Since 1991 he lives in the USA.

Art 
Eugene Gordiets is known as a surrealist artist. He writes in genres of landscape and still life. His work is compared with the works of the French artists Pierre Puvis de Chavannes and René Magritte

He was a member of the Ukrainian and USSR exhibitions since 1977. His personal exhibitions have been hosted in Paris (1989), New York (1995), Scottsdale and Nantucket (2001).

His works are stored in the Kiev National Museum of Russian Art, the Tretyakov Gallery in Moscow, the Cologne Museum of Modern Art and a number of museums in Ukraine.

In 1990, his work graced the cover of Christie’s catalog.

Honours and awards 
 Honored Artist of Ukraine (1986)

References

Bibliography 
 Evgeni Gordiets in Encyclopedia of Modern Ukraine 
 Евгений Гордиец: Каталог. Нью-Йорк, 1993.
 Євген Гордієць [Текст] // Fine Art. Прекрасне мистецтво. — К., 2008. — 4. — С. 6–7.
 Gordiets, Evgeni: [album] / Evgeni Gordiets; Вступ. сл. Elena Vasilevsky.- New York : Joèls Fine Art, [1993].- 36 p. : ill.- Gordiets
 Богдан Певний. СЕЛЕКТИВНИМ ОКОМ. Сучасність. Жовтень 1988 — ч. 10 (330)  c 55.

External links 
 Гордиец Евгений
 Evgeni Gordiets

People from Makiivka
Soviet painters
National Academy of Visual Arts and Architecture alumni
1952 births
Living people

uk:Євген Якович Гордієць